2010 Regional League Division 2 Central & Eastern Region is the 2nd season of the League competition since its establishment in 2009. It is in the third tier of the Thai football league system.

The league has been expanded from 12 clubs in 2009 to 16 clubs this season. The league winners and runners up will qualify for the 2010 Regional League Division 2 championship stage.

Changes from Last Season

Team Changes

Relocated Clubs

Thai Summit Samut Prakan and Rose Asia Pathum Thani re-located to the Regional League Bangkok Area Division 2010.
Prachuap Khiri Khan re-located to the Regional League Southern Region 2010

Expansion Clubs

Samut Sakhon, Muangkan, Phetchaburi, Ang Thong, Sa Kaeo, Prachinburi United, Pathum Thani and Kabinburi  joined the newly expanded league setup.

Stadium and locations

Final league table

Results

References

External links
  Football Association of Thailand

Regional League Central-East Division seasons
Cen